Bartrum Glacier is a small steeply crevassed glacier in the Brown Hills, flowing west between Bowling Green Plateau and Blank Peaks. It was mapped by the Victoria University of Wellington Antarctic Expedition (1962–63), and named after J.A. Bartrum (1885–1949), Professor of Geology at the University of Auckland, New Zealand.

See also
 Erewhon Basin
 List of glaciers in the Antarctic
 Glaciology

References
 

Glaciers of Oates Land